Seven ships of the Royal Navy have borne the name HMS Hazard:

  was a 14-gun sloop launched in 1711. She was wrecked in 1714 off Boston, New England.
  was a 14-gun sloop launched in 1744. She was in the hands of the Young Pretender in 1745–46. She was sold in 1749.
  was an 8-gun sloop launched in 1749 that the Navy sold in 1783. She became the mercantile Joseph and then between 1793 and 1802 she made seven voyages as a whaler. A French privateer captured her in 1800, but HMS Fisgard quickly recaptured her.
  was a 16-gun sloop launched in 1794. She was sold in 1817.
  was an 18-gun sloop launched in 1837. She was sold in 1866.
  was an  launched in 1894. She was converted to a submarine tender in 1901 and was sunk in 1918 in a collision in the English Channel.
  was a  launched in 1937. She was sold in 1949.
also
  was the 8-gun privateer sloop Subtile that  captured from the French in 1756. She was sold in 1759.

Citations and references
Citations

References

Royal Navy ship names